In neuroanatomy, a plexus (from the Latin term for "braid") is a branching network of vessels or nerves. The vessels may be blood vessels (veins, capillaries) or lymphatic vessels. The nerves are typically axons outside the central nervous system. 

The standard plural form in English is plexuses. Alternatively, the Latin plural plexūs may be used.

Types

Nerve plexuses
The four primary nerve plexuses are the cervical plexus, brachial plexus, lumbar plexus, and the sacral plexus.

Cardiac plexus

Celiac plexus

Renal plexus

Venous plexus

Choroid plexus
The choroid plexus is a part of the central nervous system in the brain and consists of capillaries, brain ventricles, and ependymal cells.

Invertebrates
The plexus is the characteristic form of nervous system in the coelenterates and persists with modifications in the flatworms. The nerves of the radially symmetric echinoderms also take this form, where a plexus underlies the ectoderm of these animals and deeper in the body other nerve cells form plexuses of limited extent.

See also 
 Cranial nerve
 Spinal nerve
 Nerve plexus
 Brachial nerve
 List of anatomy mnemonics

References

Nervous system